The Sir Joseph Banks Conservatory is a tropical house at Woodside Wildlife Park in Lincolnshire, England.

History
The Sir Joseph Banks Conservatory is a  tropical house, originally constructed in 1989 within The Lawn complex in Lincoln. It was themed with plants and reminiscent of the voyages of its namesake, Sir Joseph Banks, the British naturalist and botanist from London who, as long-time president of the Royal Society, became known for his promotion of science.

Sale 
In 2016, the site of the conservatory was sold by the City of Lincoln council to the Stokes coffee company. The conservatory building was moved to the Woodside Wildlife Park, near Langworth, which planned to use it for educational and conservation purposes, including housing crocodiles and red pandas, to show how earth has changed since Banks' voyages. The conservatory has been named 'Endeavour' by Woodside Wildlife Park, after the ship Banks sailed with to South America and Australia from 1768 to 1771. A car park was built at The Lawn on the former location of the conservatory.

References

Buildings and structures in Lincoln, England
Greenhouses in the United Kingdom
Gardens in Lincolnshire
Buildings and structures completed in 1989
1989 establishments in England